Thomas Carr Hurd (May 27, 1924 – September 5, 1982) was an American professional baseball player, a middle-relief pitcher who appeared 99 games in Major League Baseball between 1954 and 1956 for the Boston Red Sox. He was born in Danville, Virginia. He served in the United States Army during World War II.

Career 
Hurd's pro career lasted for 14 seasons (1946–49; 1951–60). It began as a shortstop in the Chicago White Sox' system, where he converted to pitching in 1948, and ended in the St. Louis Cardinals' organization. His tenure with the Red Sox began in July 1954 when, at age 30, he was purchased from the ChiSox' Charleston Senators Triple-A affiliate. In 1956, Hurd's earned run average ballooned from 3.01 to 5.33. He would spend the rest of his pitching career in the minor league. 

In his three-season major-league career, Hurd posted a 13–10 record with a 3.96 ERA and 11 saves, allowing 177 hits and 97 bases on balls, with 96 strikeouts, in 186 innings of work. He enjoyed success in 1958 as the ace relief pitcher for the American Association and Junior World Series champion Minneapolis Millers. Pitching for manager Gene Mauch, Hurd posted a 1.65 earned run average in 52 games.

Family 
Hurd was married to Peggy Wilson for 34 years and they had five children.

Death 
Hurd died from cancer in Waterloo, Iowa, at age 58.

References

Sources

Retrosheet

1924 births
1982 deaths
Baseball players from Virginia
Boston Red Sox players
Charleston Senators players
Cordele White Sox players
Deaths from cancer in Iowa
Fall River Indians players
Major League Baseball pitchers
Memphis Chickasaws players
Minneapolis Millers (baseball) players
Rochester Red Wings players
San Francisco Seals (baseball) players
Sportspeople from Danville, Virginia
Waterloo White Hawks players
United States Army personnel of World War II